Cadra reniformis is a species of snout moth in the genus Cadra. It was described by Marianne Horak in 1994. It is found along the northern coast of Australia from Townsville to Darwin, mainly in monsoon forest.

The wingspan is 15–17 mm for males and 11–18 mm for females. The head, thorax, forewing and abdomen are finely speckled with white-tipped, grey scales.

References

Phycitini
Moths described in 1994
Taxa named by Marianne Horak
Moths of Australia